"The Beggar's Petition" (or "The Beggar") is a poem written by Thomas Moss and published anonymously in 1769 which "contains much pathetic and natural sentiment finely expressed." The poem is referenced in the opening pages of Jane Austen's Northanger Abbey as an example of a poem commonly memorized by young women of the day.

It is also mentioned in Charles Dickens' "Nicholas Nickleby" as the little boy rubs his eyes with it while being boxed on the ears by the schoolmaster Mr. Squeers. It's also mentioned in Dickens's Little Dorrit.

External links
Text of poem

References

1769 poems